John Kinley Tener (July 25, 1863May 19, 1946) was an Irish-born American politician and Major League Baseball player and executive. He served as the 25th governor of Pennsylvania from 1911 until 1915. 

A Republican, he had previously served as a U.S. Representative for Pennsylvania's 24th congressional district. 

During his baseball career, Tener played as a pitcher and outfielder for the Baltimore Orioles of the American Association, the Chicago White Stockings of the National League, and the Pittsburgh Burghers of the Players' League; after his playing career, he served as President of the National League.

Biography
John Tener was born in 1863 in County Tyrone (today in Northern Ireland). His parents were George Evans Tener and Susan Wallis. In 1872, Tener's father died, and the family moved the following year to Pittsburgh, Pennsylvania.

Tener attended public schools and later worked as a clerk for hardware manufacturer Oliver Iron and Steel Corporation from 1881–1885.

In 1885, Tener, who was six-foot-four (1.93 meters), decided to try his hand at professional baseball. He joined the Haverhill, Massachusetts minor league baseball team in the New England League as a pitcher and outfielder and was a teammate of future Hall of Fame players Wilbert Robinson and Tommy McCarthy. Later that year, Tener made his Major League debut with the Baltimore Orioles of the American Association, playing in a single game as an outfielder.

While playing in Haverhill, Tener met his future wife, Harriet Day. They married in October 1889.

After his brief appearance in Baltimore, Tener continued playing minor league ball, but also returned to the corporate world, working for the Chartiers Valley Gas Company in Pittsburgh and Chambers and McKee Glass Company. In 1888, Cap Anson, the manager of the Chicago White Stockings (now the Chicago Cubs), noticed him pitching in Pittsburgh and signed Tener to a contract. Tener was a pitcher and an outfielder for two years in Chicago with moderate success. He notched a 7–5 record with a 2.74 ERA in 1888 and went 15–15 with a 3.64 ERA in 1889.

After the 1888 season, Tener accompanied the team on a world tour of Australia, New Zealand, Egypt, France, Italy and England. While in England, Tener was chosen to help explain the game of baseball to the Prince of Wales, who would go on to become King Edward VII.

Tener was elected as Secretary of the Brotherhood of Professional Players, an early players union and served under President John Montgomery Ward, a future member of the Baseball Hall of Fame. In 1890, unhappy with baseball's reserve clause, Tener joined other players in jumping to the Players' League. Playing for the Pittsburgh Burghers, Tener compiled a poor 3–11 record. The league folded after one year and Tener decided to retire from professional baseball.

He entered the banking business in Charleroi, Pennsylvania in 1891, becoming a cashier at the First National Bank of Charleroi. By 1897, he was the president of the bank. Over the years, Tener became a prominent business leader, founding the Charleroi Savings and Trust Company and the Mercantile Bridge Company.

Political career
In 1908, Tener, a Republican, was elected to serve in the 61st United States Congress from Pennsylvania's 24th congressional district. As a former ballplayer, Tener organized the first Congressional Baseball Game which is now an annual tradition on Capitol Hill.

Tener planned to run for re-election in 1910. Instead, the Republican Party nominated Tener as its candidate for Governor where he would face a divided electorate. Pennsylvania experienced a scandal during the construction of the new Pennsylvania State Capitol. State Treasurer William H. Berry had found that there had been an unappropriated cost for the building's construction of over $7.7 million ($ today), including a number of questionable charges. The scandal led to the conviction of the building architect and a former State Treasurer. Berry failed to get the Democratic nomination and broke away taking independent Republicans and Democrats to form his new Keystone Party.

Tener won the election with 415,614 votes (41.7%) over Berry with 382,127 (38.2%) with the help of a 45,000-vote victory in the City of Philadelphia. The Democratic candidate, State Senator Webster Grim of Doylestown, Pennsylvania finished third with 13%. Governor Tener was the first Governor since the American Revolution to be born outside the United States and only the second in Pennsylvania's history to have been born outside of the state.

Tener's initiatives as governor included reforming the state public school system and the highway system. With schools, Tener signed into law the School Code of 1911, which established a State Board of Education empowered to set minimum standards and minimum salaries. The Code also mandated that all children regardless of race or color between the ages of eight and sixteen would be required to attend school.

The Governor also signed the Sproul Highway Bill into law, which gave the state responsibility over 9,000 public roads that counties and cities had previously maintained. Rebuffed by the voters for a bond issue to fund the program, Tener signed a bill designating fees from automobile registrations and drivers licenses to be used for road funding. In 1913, the Governor sign a bill requiring hunting licenses in Pennsylvania, using the fees generated by the licenses to fund conservation programs.

Tener also signed in to action in 1913 a bill that would lead to the creation of the Pennsylvania Historical Commission (PHC), which years later would be merged to form the Pennsylvania Historical and Museum Commission (PHMC). This would allow funding to be allocated to the preserve and protect the Commonwealths heritage through the Pennsylvania Historic Markers Program and the transfer of historic properties to PHC.

Baseball executive
Tener maintained his interest in baseball after retiring as a player. In 1912, Governor Tener spoke out against gambling in baseball, and informed district attorneys around the state that he believed existing laws could be used against illegal wagering. He also offered the influence and assistance of the state government to support any district attorney who chose to act against wagering.

In 1913, Philadelphia Phillies owner William Baker proposed offering the position of National League president to Tener after the owners declined to extend the contract of president Thomas Lynch. Tener accepted the offer at a contract of $25,000 ($ today) per year, but was not paid until April 1915 when his term as Governor expired.

Early in his administration, Tener had his hands full as league president, serving a double role as Governor of Pennsylvania. The Federal League declared itself a major league and began competing for players in 1914. A number of players began jumping to the new league including Joe Tinker.

At the same time, Tener had to mediate a dispute between Chicago Cubs owner Charles Murphy and Cub manager and star player, Johnny Evers. Evers claimed that he had been fired by Murphy after a salary dispute. Murphy claimed in turn that the future hall-of-famer had resigned with the intent of jumping to the new Federal League. Murphy later attempted to broker a trade to the Boston Braves in which the Cubs would receive Boston star Bill Sweeney. The League originally ruled that Murphy had broken the terms of Evers's contract by not giving him ten days notice before the dismissal and that the punishment would be that Boston did not have to give the players to Chicago. This led to a protest by Murphy.

At the time, Murphy was not a well-regarded owner by his peers and the League was afraid that Evers would go to the Federal League to join his former teammate, Joe Tinker. The dispute gave the owners the opportunity to rid themselves of Murphy. Tener arranged for newspaper publisher Charles P. Taft, who was a minority shareholder and had helped the league to force out Phillies owner Horace Fogel, to buy the team and force Murphy out.

Tener later faced the prospect of players' strikes in 1914 and 1917. In 1914, the Baseball Players Fraternity, led by Dave Fultz threatened to strike over the transfer of Clarence Kraft to the minor leagues from the Brooklyn Robins. Brooklyn had tried to send Kraft to their minor league club in Newark, New Jersey, but the Nashville Vols claimed that they had the rights to Kraft. Going to Nashville would have cost Kraft $150 ($ today) in salary. When baseball's National Commission ruled that Kraft had to report to Nashville, he appealed to Fultz for help. Although American League President Ban Johnson sought a confrontation, Tener brokered a deal in which Brooklyn paid for Kraft's rights and sent him to Newark.

Tener ruled Benny Kauff ineligible to join the New York Giants baseball team in April 1915. Kauff played center field for the Giants on April 29, 1915. Tener said that Kauff, a member of the Brooklyn Tip-Tops of the Federal League, was a jumper from organized baseball. In order to play for New York of the National League, he needed formal reinstatement.

In 1917, Fultz, emboldened by his efforts in the Kraft cash presented a list of demands to the National Commission to improve the playing conditions in the minor leagues. Tener rejected three of the demands as they were unrelated to Major League Baseball and only applied to minor league players. Tener also noted that the fourth demand, that injured players be paid their full salaries, had already been met in the 1917 contract. Fultz went on to threaten to affiliate with the American Federation of Labor and lead the players on a walkout if his demands were not met.

Even though Tener himself had been a member of the Brotherhood of Professional Players in his playing days and, as part of the National Commission, initially certified the Player's Fraternity in 1914, he was not amused by the threats. On the labor side, AFL leader Samuel Gompers did not welcome the idea and many major leaguers were not interested in striking for the benefit of minor league players. The National Commission, immediately withdrew recognition from the Players' Fraternity. Afterwards, the Players' Fraternity membership declined and the organization ceased to exist.

In November 1917, Tener accepted a one-year contract extension, but was troubled by the infighting between the National League's owners. In 1918, the league became embroiled in a dispute with the American League over the rights to pitcher Scott Perry. Tener believed that Philadelphia Athletics owner Connie Mack had broken an agreement with both leagues by going to court in the matter. Tener demanded that the National League break off relations, which could have included cancelling the World Series. However, the owners did not support him and Tener resigned in August 1918.

Later life
After leaving baseball, Tener returned to his business interests in Pittsburgh. In 1926, he tried to gain the Republican nomination to run again for Governor but was unsuccessful, finishing third at the convention. In the 1930s, Tener was elected as a director of the Philadelphia Phillies.

In 1935, Tener's wife Harriet died. In 1936, he married Leone Evans who died in 1937 after an illness. He engaged in the insurance business until his death, aged 82, in Pittsburgh in 1946.

He was interred in Homewood Cemetery in Pittsburgh.

Buildings named in his honor include a residence hall in the East Halls area of the University Park campus of the Pennsylvania State University and the Charleroi Public Library.

In 1999, the Pennsylvania Historical and Museum Commission installed a historical marker in Charleroi, noting Tener's historic importance.

See also
List of players from Ireland in Major League Baseball
United States Congressional Baseball Game
List of U.S. state governors born outside the United States
List of American sportsperson-politicians

References

External links

.
Governor Tener Biography at the Pennsylvania Historical Society

1863 births
1946 deaths
Major League Baseball executives
Republican Party governors of Pennsylvania
Politicians from Pittsburgh
Irish emigrants to the United States (before 1923)
Sportspeople from County Tyrone
Major League Baseball players from Ireland
Irish baseball players
Philadelphia Phillies executives
Chicago White Stockings players
Pittsburgh Burghers players
19th-century baseball players
American athlete-politicians
National League presidents
Baseball players from Pittsburgh
Haverhill (minor league baseball) players
Lawrence (minor league baseball) players
Republican Party members of the United States House of Representatives from Pennsylvania
Burials at Homewood Cemetery